Prof. Bruce Michael Boghosian is an American mathematician.  He has been a Professor of Mathematics at Tufts University since 2000, and served as chair of Mathematics there from 2006 to 2010.  He also holds adjunct positions in the Tufts University Departments of Physics and Computer Science.

Research interests
Boghosian's research interests center on applied dynamical systems and applied probability theory, with an emphasis on kinetic theory, as it applies to fluids, soft condensed matter, and agent based models in the social sciences.  From 2014 to the present, his work has centered on kinetic-theoretical models of wealth distribution.

Education
Boghosian received his bachelor's degree in physics and master's degree in nuclear engineering from the Massachusetts Institute of Technology. He earned his Ph.D. from the Department of Applied Science at the University of California, Davis.

Career
From 1978 to 1986, he was a Physicist in the Plasma Theory Group at the Lawrence Livermore National Laboratory in California.

From 1986 through 1994, he was a Senior Scientist in the Mathematical Research Group at Thinking Machines Corporation in Cambridge, Massachusetts.

From 1994 through 2000, prior to coming to Tufts University, Boghosian held the position of Research Associate Professor at the Center for Computational Science and Department of Physics at Boston University.

From 2010 to 2014, while on leave from Tufts University, Boghosian served as the third president of the American University of Armenia in Yerevan, Armenia.  During that time, he oversaw the creation, accreditation and inauguration of the undergraduate program at AUA—the first American-accredited bachelor program in the former Soviet Union.

Boghosian has held visiting academic positions at the Départment de Mathématiques, Paris-Sud University in Orsay, France; the École normale supérieure in Paris, France; Peking University in Beijing, China; University College London; the University of California, Berkeley; the International Centre for Theoretical Physics in Trieste, Italy; the Schlumberger Cambridge Research Centre in Cambridge, United Kingdom; and the Massachusetts Institute of Technology.

Fellowships and publications
Boghosian has been a fellow of the American Physical Society since 2000, and a foreign member of the Armenian National Academy of Sciences since 2008.  He is a recipient of Tufts University's Distinguished Scholar Award in 2010, and its Undergraduate Initiative in Teaching (UNITE) award in 2002.  In 2014 he received the "Order of the Republic of Armenia" from the Armenian Prime Minister, and the "Gold Medal" from the Armenian Ministry of Education and Science.  His 2019 article "The Inescapable Casino" was published in six languages, and included in the volume "The Best Writing on Mathematics 2020".

Boghosian has over 110 publications, has given over 220 invited talks, and has one patent.
He is a member of the editorial boards of the Journal of Computational Science, Physica A, and International Journal of Modern Physics C – Physics and Computers.

References

American mathematicians
American people of Armenian descent
Tufts University faculty
Academic staff of the American University of Armenia
Boston University faculty
Thinking Machines Corporation
Lawrence Livermore National Laboratory staff
Massachusetts Institute of Technology alumni
University of California, Davis alumni
Academic staff of the École Normale Supérieure
Academic staff of Peking University
Academics of University College London
University of California, Berkeley faculty
Massachusetts Institute of Technology faculty
Fellows of the American Physical Society
Year of birth missing (living people)
Living people
Place of birth missing (living people)